"Toutes les femmes de ta vie" is a 2001 song recorded by French girl group L5. It was their debut single released on November 26, 2001, from its first album L5 on which it features as first track. The song was also included on the band's 2004 album live Le live. It was a huge success in France where it was a number-one hit and can be considered as L5's signature song.

The song was produced by Maxim Nucci, Jenifer Bartoli's boyfriend at the time. "Toutes les femmes de ta vie" was inspired by a Britney Spears' song and was originally composed for Ophélie Winter. This woman anthem had several writers, including Doriand who recorded "Au Diable le Paradis" in 1994. "Toutes les femmes de ta vie" became the seventh best-selling single of the 21st century in France, with 825,000 units sold. and was part of many French compilations such as Barbie la compilation, Star of the TV, Just Girls and Hits de diamant. The song was also included on L5's 2006 best of.

It was band's sole charting single in Belgium (Wallonia).

Track listings
 CD single
12" single
 "Toutes les femmes de ta vie" — 3:15
 "Où sont passés les hommes ?" (Doriand/Régis Ducatillon/Jérémy Olivier) — 2:58

 Digital download
 "Toutes les femmes de ta vie" — 3:15
 "Toutes les femmes de ta vie" (live) — 3:40

Personnel
Maxim Nucci - backing vocals, bass guitar, guitar & keyboards
Phil Delire - programming
Yannic Fonderie - programming
Laurent Darmon - photography
★ Bronx - artwork

Production
Produced by Maxim Nucci
Engineered & mixed by Djoum at ICP Studios, Brussels
Mastered by Pompon Finkelstein at Translab, Paris

Charts

Certifications and sales

References

2001 debut singles
L5 (band) songs
SNEP Top Singles number-one singles
Songs with feminist themes
Songs written by Billy Steinberg
Songs written by Johan Åberg
Songs written by Sigurd Rosnes
2001 songs
Mercury Records singles